Avora Records (abbreviated as AR) is an Indian indie rock band from Aizawl, Mizoram formed in 2012 by Khos Hmar, Mamaa Ralte and Ruata Renthlei as a side-project to record songs. The group went through a series of line-up changes till it turned into a band with Stephen Hnamte, Sanga Ralte & CK Hauzel joining it. Since 2016, the band's line-up has been the same and in 2017, Mamaa Ralte parted ways with the band.

In 2018, the band released its debut singles Sunday & 23:00. In 2019, they released If You're Not Sweating To This Then Honey You're Not 90's and Waltz Of The Foolish Youth in 2020. The band's debut album, Comedians On Drugs was released on October 1, 2020.

They gained nationwide attention after winning Sennheiser Top 50 Season 3 and Hornbill International Rock Contest in 2017. The band has performed all across the country and shared the stage with prominent artists like Blackstratblues, Indus Creed, Karsh Kale, Mono, Parvaaz, Raghu Dixit, Thermal and a Quarter, and many more.

Career

2012–2016: History
	The group was formed in 2012 by Khos (Lalkhawsiama), Mamaa Ralte (Vanlalmuanpuia) and Ruata (Laremruata Renthlei) in Aizawl, Mizoram. It was initially formed as a side-project to record songs and upload them on SoundCloud and YouTube. Avora Records gets its name from Mamaa's father Marova. Hriata Renthlei played the bass for the group till 2014 and in the same year, Stephen (Stephen Marcus Rualzakhuma Hnamte) joined the group to do the vocal sections.
	In early 2016, Sanga (Lalsangzuala Ralte) joined the group as the drummer and by October 2016, Avora Records became a performing band and in their initial years, they did local club & restaurant shows in Aizawl. The first song that they wrote together as a band was 23:00. Later in 2017, Mamaa Ralte who till then acted as the producer & manager for the newly formed band, left it due to a conflict of interest.

2017–2018: Initial years as a band, touring, Sunday & 23:00
	The band's initial years have been touring and playing across India at various music competitions to open-air music festivals. In 2017, Melvyn Fanai played the bass for the band but was soon replaced by CK (Lalchhuankima Hauzel). During this time, Khos Hmar wasn't actively touring with the band because of his job in Bangalore. Later in September 2017, the band went on to participate in Sennheiser Top 50: Season 3 and won the competition where they were judged by the famous Bollywood trio Shankar–Ehsaan–Loy, folk-rock singer Raghu Dixit and Bollywood playback singer Papon. This victory shot the band to nationwide fame, grabbing the attention of many fellow musicians, festival promoters, publications & a lot of listeners. Khos who wasn't actively touring and playing with the band decided to quit his job and finally returned to Aizawl to fully focus on the band.
	The band went on to do shows in Guwahati, Delhi, Aizawl, Hard Rock Cafe  in Mumbai, NH7 Weekender in Meghalaya, Orange Festival in Arunachal Pradesh. By the end of 2017, in December the band participated in Hornbill International Rock Contest in Nagaland and won the competition. They were judged by Uday Benegal from the Indus Creed and others. The number of achievements in the year 2017 cemented the band's place as a prominent face in the northeast Indian rock music scene.
	In 2018, the band toured across North-east India with multiple shows in Aizawl, Dimapur, Guwahati, Jowai and Shillong. They also performed at Hard Rock Cafe Mumbai, Ziro Festival of Arunachal Pradesh and Hornbill Festival of Nagaland. The same year, the band released their debut single Sunday and 23:00 - the first song they wrote together as a band in 2015. Rolling Stones India featured the music video of Sunday in their ‘10 Best Indian Music Videos of 2018’ article.

2019–present: IYANSTTTHYN90's & Comedians On Drugs
	The band went to perform at Udaipur World Music Festival in Udaipur, NH7 Weekender at Meghalaya, concerts in Assam, Delhi, Mizoram and Meghalaya. They released their third single If You're Not Sweating To This Then Honey You're Not 90's (abbreviated as 'IYANSTTTHYN90's') in August 2019 and their fourth single Waltz Of The Foolish Youth in May 2020 featuring Pangpari from Flowerpot. Their debut album, Comedians On Drugs was released on October 1, 2020, which was recorded at Kings & Prophets Recording Studios in Aizawl, Mizoram.
	The band had planned for an India tour to promote their debut album but it was eventually cancelled due to the ongoing COVID-19 pandemic in India.

Musical Influences
The band was formed during the time when alternative grunge, emo, indie pop & punk rock wave had reached India. The band members take influence from Angels & Airwaves, Blink-182, Death Cab for Cutie, Extreme, Fall Out Boy, Incubus, My Chemical Romance, Mutemath, Panic! At The Disco, Radiohead, The Beatles, The Used, also from Broadway Jazz and Disney movies.

Band members

Current members
 Khos Hmar – guitars 
 Ruata Renthlei – guitars 
 Stephen Hnamte – vocals 
 Sanga Ralte – drums 
 CK Hauzel – bass 

Former members
 Hriata Renthlei – bass 
 Mamaa Ralte – producer , manager 
 Melvyn Fanai – bass 

Session and touring musicians
 Chhanhima Ralte – guitar 
 Vanlalhruaia – guitar & keys 
 George Hmar – keys 

Timeline

Discography

Studio albums
Comedians On Drugs (2020)

Singles

Music Videos

Other releases

References

Indian indie rock groups
Mizo people
People from Aizawl
Musical groups established in 2012
Singers from Mizoram